The General Operations Force (Jawi: ڤاسوكن ڬرقن عام) is the light infantry arm of the Royal Malaysia Police. The General Operations Force was established in 1948 during the Malayan Emergency by the British Administration when Malaya was a colony. The police service was mobilised to the field role, primarily to engaging Communist guerrillas during the emerging Insurgency. When Malaysia was formed in 1963, this law enforcement unit was then known as the Police Field Force. The title was adopted when it dropped the previous handle widely referred to as the Jungle Squad.

History

The Jungle Squad was established based on the Malay States Guides which formed in 1826. The Malay States Guides was a paramilitary force initially formed with a strength of 900 members and led by R. S. F. Walker as the first commandant. The regiment was involved in World War I and together with Field Force Aden, they fought Ottoman forces in the Southwest of South Arabia (now Saudi Arabia) for five years. The regiment was disbanded for reasons of economy in 1919.

The British Military Administration (BMA) had mobilised the police General Duties to assume the role of the military effort against the insurgencies. The Jungle Squad was established in 1948 for that purpose against communist terrorists. Initially the new police arm was called the Flying Squad. However, it was renamed the "Jungle Squad" in the line with its major role against communist terrorists in the forest. In 1951, the Jungle Squad restructured and became known as "Jungle Company". In 1953, the Jungle Company continued to be augmented and became known by the name Police Field Force. It was under the command of the Police Commissioner of the Federation of Malaya and later when Malaysia was established it was placed under the Chief of Police. The Jungle Company was then deployed together with the British Army to infiltrate and track down communist insurgents operating in the jungles of Malaya. The strength of a single platoon then consisted of a mixture of 15 personnel led by a Lance Corporal to an Inspector. Over the period covering the Malayan Emergency (1948–1960) the Police Field Force suffered over 1,000 casualties.

The Police Field Force was also involved during the Indonesia-Malaysia confrontations. In various actions during the Confrontation, the Police Field Force detained Indonesian irregulars sent to the peninsula, with the view of running clandestine operations on Malaysian soil. Following the May 13, 1969 incident, the Malaysian government realised the importance of a mobile and independent team and more capable to the facing of public order situations.

Following the disarmament of the Malayan Communist Party (MCP) on 2 December 1989, the Police Field Force was reformed with attenuation from 21 battalions to 17 battalions on 1 September 1994. PPH changed its name to the General Operations Force (PGA) on 20 October 1997. On 11 November 1997, the submission of the RMP pennants ceremony was officiated by the King of Malaysia. This change of name in accordance with the rating duties GOF background itself. Prior to this duties in GOF associated with the forest for combating the communist threats. After the communists disarmed on 2 December 1989, GOF tasks changed in that scenarios became more varied.

Organisations

Prior to 1997, besides the regular Jungle Squad, there were a few specialised units attached to Police Field Forces:
 Commando Force; "PPH 69" (Jungle Squad 69)
 Senoi Praaq Force
 Border Scouts (for Sabah and Sarawak)
 Unit Kawalan Kawasan (UKK) (Area Control Unit)
 Unit Pencegah Penyeludupan (UPP) (Anti-Smuggling Unit)
After GOF restructuring, the Jungle Squad 69 was separated into a new police command while Senoi Praaq was absorbed into GOF and renamed to 'GOF 3rd Battalion'. Border Scouts and UKK were disbanded and its members absorbed into the GOF battalions and regular police forces. UPP was then formed into a federal agency whose members are drawn from the Royal Malaysian Police, Royal Malaysian Customs and Immigration Department of Malaysia. The UPP later renamed to Agensi Keselamatan Sempadan (Border Security Agency) in 2015.

At present, the Royal Malaysia Police General Operations Force is organised along military lines consisting of brigades, battalions, companies, platoons and sections deployed where needed.

GOF Brigades
There are currently five brigades located in both Peninsular Malaysia and East Malaysia and every Brigade is headed by those ranked Senior Assistant Commissioner (SAC) or above. The five GOF brigades are:
 GOF Northern Brigade; based in Ulu Kinta, Perak
 GOF Central Brigade; based in Cheras, Kuala Lumpur
 GOF Southeast Brigade; based in Kuantan, Pahang
 GOF Sarawak Brigade; based in Kuching, Sarawak
 GOF Sabah Brigade; based in Kota Kinabalu, Sabah
The number of GOF battalions under command of GOF brigades varies based on local needs. The Central and Sabah Brigades are composed of five battalions each. The Northern Brigade contains four battalions while the Southeast and Sarawak Brigades are composed of three battalions each.

GOF Battalions
GOF has a strength of 20 battalions located in both Peninsular Malaysia and East Malaysia with each commanded by a Police Superintendent. Each battalion consists of about three infantry companies and one mortar platoon.

Senoi Praaq

The Senoi Praaq means War People in the language of the Semai Indigenous people of Peninsula Malaysia. The formation was moved to the Police Field Force in 1968 and increased to two battalions. The Senoi Praaq were established in 1957 employed with tracking and security roles, apart from performing the main function of contact to the aborigines peoples. Manned by the aborigines of Peninsular Malaysia that were skilled for their jungle tracking, it was successful in engaging the communist terrorists during the Malayan Emergency. The Senoi Praaq can be distinguished from other mainline GOF Battalions by the use of the distinctive maroon beret and red hackle.

Tiger Platoons
With the separation of 69 Commando, which now part of the Pasukan Gerakan Khas (Special Operations Command; SOCOM), the General Operations Force Command established new versatile units with Special Operations capability to operate in all GOF Brigades. These elite platoons were formed for special assignments, covert and overt operations and Search And Rescue (SAR), and are known generally as the Tiger Platoons.

Tiger Platoons from GOF Sabah and Sarawak Brigades actively operates as the region's main special operations forces as both states are located far from Pasukan Gerakan Khas Headquarters.

GOF roles

The General Operations Force are deployed, equipped and trained for specified roles in times of peace and during emergencies. The various roles include neutralising armed criminals, border patrols, counter terrorism, anti piracy and maritime security. The GOF also assists in general duties such as public security, close quarters combat in urban settings and anti smuggling patrols. In times of conflict or emergency, GOF brigades are used primarily for assigned duties in counter-terrorism and anti - guerrilla warfare. A brigade is essentially trained, equipped and organised for paramilitary roles in the field and also for insertion in major urban conurbations. All personnel are drawn from mainline Police Training Schools and inducted to GOF Training Centres, with the view of completing the study of anti guerrilla warfare and military training courses before graduating to GOF Battalions. Where borders are perilously dangerous, GOF units are deployed in localised security sweeps and defence operations. The GOF also employs units in riots and disturbances where necessary.

Training
The first Training Centre was based at Sik, Kedah in 1949. Successful candidates trained there were sent on to the Police Field Force. Another School for the Police Field Force was opened in Sungai Buloh, Selangor with the aim of conducting basic training and refresher courses. In 1953, one new training centre was established in Dusun Tua, Hulu Langat, Selangor renamed the Jungle Squad Training Centre. In year 1964, the SLPPH was transferred to Kroh, Perak following the closure of the first two centres. The training centre itself was transferred again to Kentonmen, Ulu Kinta, Perak. In 1997, the training centre is renamed to Sekolah Latihan Pasukan Gerakan Am, SLPGA in line with the change of name of the Police Field Force to current Pasukan Gerakan Am. On 22 September 2006, the training centre once again change its name to Pusat Latihan PGA (PLPGA).

It is a must for GOF police officers to enter the GOF Basic Course. The course last for 14 weeks and they together with Senoi Praaq trainees need to attend Public Order Reserve Unit (PORU) before they can graduate.

The modules of the GOF Basic Course are:
 Physical Training
 Weapon Training
 Field Skills Module
 Combat Skills Module
 Operation Techniques Module
 Intelligence Module
 Counter-insurgency Module
 Conventional Warfare Module
 Public Order Module
 Public Policy Module

To enter the elite Senoi Praaq Battalions, Malaysian aboriginal needs to enter Orang Asli Constable Basic Course which last for six months. This course is a collaborations between the RMP and Department of Orang Asli Development.

Headquarters

The GOF battalions will be assisted by armoured car from:
 1st Armored Squadron Kulim, Kedah
 3rd Armored Squadron Ulu Kinta, Perak
 5th Armored Squadron Cheras, Kuala Lumpur
 7th Armored Squadron Bakri, Muar, Johor
 9th Armored Squadron Kuantan, Pahang
 11th Armored Squadron Kuching, Sarawak

Current task
The Police GOF was successful in dealing with the armed rebellion led by the communist terrorists in Malaysia. Today the roles of the General Operations Force includes border and maritime security, anti piracy patrols, counter-terrorism, public security, search and rescue (SAR) and organised crime.

On 20 October 1997, the Police Field Force letterhead was changed to the new title; the  General Operations Force or Pasukan Gerakan Am composed of 17 battalions organised in five brigades, deployed in both Peninsular Malaysia and East Malaysia.

In June 2004, one specialised battalion was tasked for VVIP security. It is the GOF 19th Battalion, based in Cheras, Kuala Lumpur.

In 2008, the GOF 20th Battalion was established and tasked specifically for airport special security in KLIA. The battalion then renamed to GOF KLIA Special Battalion.

In February 2014, after the Lahad Datu standoff, Malaysian Prime Minister Najib Razak agrees to establish a new GOF brigade task to control Eastern Sabah Security Zone (ESSZONE). The new brigade is named GOF 20th Battalion.

Future plans 
Royal Malaysian Police wishes to add another GOF Battalion based in Kunak, Sabah to provide security to ESSZONE and will be known as 21st Battalion. With this addition, the Sabah Brigade will be split into two different brigades which is Northern Sabah Brigade and Eastern Sabah Brigade.

Killed in the line of duty

Keramat Pulai incidents 
On 3 June 1976, 35 recruits from Police Field Force members has been ambushed by the communist bandits at Bukit Keramat Pulai, Perak during their final phase of Basic Jungle Squad Training. During the incident at 12:45pm, Cpl 31507 Ridzuan who was a platoon leader as well as drill instructor was fatally shot in his side of eye. Three trainees  TPC 63897 Zainal, TPC 63899 Yusof and TPC 64010 Md. Saad were also killed about 15 metres from the communist control post. However, TPC 60899 Mohamad Salim and his teammates returned enemy fire. Shortly, this platoon successfully captured the communist stronghold which was modified to look like a house after the communist retreated after receiving violent opposition from the trainees. On extraordinary courage, TPC 60899 Mohamad Salim and TPC Mohammad Noh Hashim were both awarded the Panglima Gagah Berani one year later.

Operations
 1948 – 1960 - During the Malayan Emergency, the Police Field Force were involved in security and offensive operations against communist insurgents.
 1963 – 1966 - The service together with  military forces to fight against the Indonesian soldiers during the Confrontation.
 1968 – 1989 - The Police Field Force deployed to track down the Communist Terrorists before the CPM accepted unconditional surrender in 1989.
 1969 – The Police Field Force involved in security roles during the 13 May 1969 riots in Kuala Lumpur.
 2001 – The General Operations Force supported the Pasukan Gerakan Khas anti-terror police to track downed Mat Komando, the crime leader of Gang 13 before he killed in shoot-out in the hut at Kampung Hujung Keton, Pendang, Kedah.
 2007 – The Royal Malaysia Police deployed a force of 136 men from the Sarawak General Operations Force to Timor Leste. The force joined the United Nations Integrated Mission in Timor Leste, employed in the peace-keeping role.
 2013 – Involved in 2013 Lahad Datu standoff. Deployed alongside Pasukan Gerakan Khas, Grup Gerak Khas, 10 Paratrooper Brigade, PASKAL, PASKAU, Unit Gempur Marin and Special Task and Rescue.

Weaponry
The firearms used by GOF during the year 1948 - 1980s.

The firearms used by GOF during the year 1980 - presents.

See also
Directorate of National Coordination (Laos)
Republic of Vietnam National Police Field Force

References

External links

1948 establishments in Malaya
Law enforcement units
Law enforcement in Malaysia
Organizations established in 1948
Police units of Malaysia
Royal Malaysia Police
Non-military counterinsurgency organizations
Non-military counterterrorist organizations